The inferior anastomotic vein (also known as the vein of Labbe) is one of several superficial cerebral veins. It forms an anastomosis between the superficial middle cerebral vein and transverse sinus, opening into either at either end.

It courses across the surface of the temporal lobe. It drains adjacent cortical regions, gathering tributaries from minor veins of the temporal lobe.

It is highly variable.

History 
It was named after the 19th century French surgeon Charles Labbé (1851–1889), the nephew of the surgeon and politician Léon Labbé (1832–1916).

See also
 Superior anastomotic vein

Additional Images

References

External links
 

Veins of the head and neck